The Name of Mary Church is a Roman Catholic parish church in Novi Sad, Serbia, dedicated to the feast of the Holy Name of Mary. It is the largest church in Novi Sad, and is located in the city center on the Trg Slobode (Liberty Square). Locals  refer to it as the "cathedral", even though Novi Sad belongs to the Roman Catholic Diocese of Subotica, whose cathedral is located in Subotica.

History
After the 1699 Treaty of Karlowitz, Novi Sad became part of the Habsburg monarchy. The local Catholic parish was organized in 1702, and the original church was built in 1719 on the same location as today's church. It was dedicated to Mary Help of Christians in the memory of the Holy League success in the Battle of Vienna. Later, it was renamed the Name of Mary Church. This original church was destroyed in 1742. A new, second church was built on the same location. Catholic Archbishop of Kalocsa Patacsich Gábor dedicated this new church in 1742. This, second church, was heavily damaged in the bombing during the Hungarian Revolution of 1848 and its bell-tower was destroyed. It was later partially reconstructed. 

In 1891, the city council made a decision to demolish the old church, and to build a new one on the same location. Hungarian architect György Molnár designed the church in 1892 for free. The old church was demolished the same year, and the new one started. The main construction was finished in November 1893. The 72-meters high bell-tower with the golden cross was finished in October 1894.

Art and architecture
 
The church is a three-nave building, with neo-gothic arches. There are twenty stained glasses depicting saints and church fathers. The church has mechanical pipe organ with 24 registers.

The church has four altars. The main one in the apse is made of the carved wood from Tyrol, the windows with stained glass from Budapest and the roof tiles were made of Zsolnay ceramics. The church has four confessionals and a marble baptistry. It is the tallest church in Bačka region and dominates the city center of Novi Sad.

See also

Religious architecture in Novi Sad

References

Roman Catholic churches completed in 1894
19th-century Roman Catholic church buildings in Serbia
Churches in Novi Sad
Roman Catholic churches in Vojvodina